Paul Burke (born 25 July 1966 in Preston, Lancashire) is a former professional boxer from England, who competed in the lightweight and light welterweight divisions  (– 60 kg). His career highlight was beating Bernard Paul to become the lightweight commonwealth champion. He went on to successfully defend the title numerous times with good wins over rivals in the division.

See also
 List of British lightweight boxing champions

External links
 British Boxing
 

Sportspeople from Preston, Lancashire
1966 births
Living people
English male boxers
Lightweight boxers
Light-welterweight boxers